The Siberian High (also Siberian Anticyclone;  (Aziatsky antitsiklon)) is a massive collection of cold dry air that accumulates in the northeastern part of Eurasia from September until April. It is usually centered on Lake Baikal. The atmospheric pressure is often above . The Siberian High is responsible both for severe winter cold and attendant dry conditions with little snow and few or no glaciers across Siberia, Mongolia, and China. During the summer, the Siberian High is largely replaced by the Asiatic low.

Overview

The Siberian High affects the weather patterns in most parts of the Northern Hemisphere: its influence extends as far west as Italy, bringing freezing conditions also in the warm South, and as far southeast as Malaysia, where it is a critical component of the northeast monsoon. Occasionally a strong Siberian High can bring unusually cold weather into the tropics as far southeast as the Philippines. It may block or reduce the size of low-pressure cells and generate dry weather across much of the Asian landscape with the exception of regions such as Hokuriku and the Caspian Sea coast of Iran that receive orographic rainfall from the winds it generates. As a result of the Siberian High, coastal winters in the main city of Pacific Russia Vladivostok are very cold in relation to its latitude and proximity to the ocean.

Siberian air is generally colder than Arctic air, because unlike Arctic air which forms over the sea ice around the North Pole, Siberian air forms over the cold tundra of Siberia, which does not radiate heat the same way the ice of the Arctic does.

Genesis and variability
In general, the Siberian High-pressure system begins to build up at the end of August, reaches its peak in the winter, and remains strong until the end of April. Its genesis at the end of the Arctic summer is caused by the convergence of summer air flows being cooled over interior northeast Asia as days shorten. In the process of the Siberian High's formation, the upper-level jet is transferred across northern Eurasia by adiabatic cooling and descending advection, which in extreme cases creates "cold domes" that outbreak over warmer parts of East Asia.

In spite of its immense influence on the weather experienced by a large proportion of the world's population, scientific studies of the Siberian High have been late in coming, though variability of its behavior was observed as early as the 1960s. However, recent studies of observed global warming over Asia have shown that weakening of the Siberian High is a prime driver of warmer winters in almost all of inland extra-tropical Asia and even over most parts of Europe, with the strongest relationship over the West Siberian Plain and significant relationships as far west as Hungary and as far southeast as Guangdong. Precipitation has also been found to be similarly inversely related to the mean central pressure of the Siberian High over almost all of Eastern Europe during the boreal winter, and similar relationships are found in southern China, whilst the opposite correlation exists over the Coromandel Coast and Sri Lanka. Other studies have suggested that the strength of the Siberian High shows an inverse correlation with the high-pressure systems over North Africa.
Another correlation has been noted, a connection of a weaker Siberian High and Arctic oscillation when the Antarctic oscillation (AAO) is stronger.

Because increased snow and ice cover enhances the Siberian High, the Siberian High was both more intense and located further west during the early Middle Pleistocene as a result of the extensive glaciation of mountain ranges across Central Asia. The decrease in magnitude of the Siberian High during the Holocene enabled eastward encroachment of westerlies enriched with water vapour, precipitating an increase in low altitude afforestation of Central Asia.

See also

Siberian Express
Arctic dipole anomaly
Cold wave
North American High
Polar vortex
Aleutian Low

References

Anticyclones
Climate of Asia
Climate of Europe
Climate of Russia
Climate change in Russia
Climate of China
Environment of Mongolia